Manheulles is a commune in the Meuse department in Grand Est in north-eastern France.

Born in Manheulles 
Auguste Desgodins (1826–1913), French missionary in China and Tibet

See also
Communes of the Meuse department

References

Communes of Meuse (department)